"Yesterday Love" (stylized as "YESTERDAY LOVE") is a song by Japanese singer songwriter Mai Kuraki, taken from her eleventh studio album Smile (2017). It was released on January 11, 2017 digitally and as a video single by Northern Music. The song was used as the ending fifty-third theme to the animation TV program Case Closed.

Commercial performance
"Yesterday Love" debuted at number 6 on the Oricon Weekly Blu-ray Chart and has sold over 6,000 copies.

Live performance
On January 14, 2017, Kuraki performed "Yesterday Love" and "Love, Day After Tomorrow" on Music Fair. In the performance of "Love, Day After Tomorrow", she collaborated with Ami, Reina Washio and Shizuka, the members of the Japanese girl group, E-girls.

On January 27, 2017, Kuraki performed the song on Music Station.

Music video
A short version of the official music video was first released on Kuraki's official YouTube account on 29 December 2016. The video adopts the technique of Virtual reality. As of August 2022, it has received over 380,000 views on YouTube. The video was directed by Atsunori Toshi.

Track listing

Charts

Weekly charts

Certification and sales

|-
! scope="row"| Japan (RIAJ)
| 
| 6,099 
|}

Release history

References

2017 singles
Mai Kuraki songs
Songs written by Mai Kuraki
2017 songs
Case Closed songs
Song recordings produced by Daiko Nagato